Malagola is an Italian surname. Notable people with the surname include:

Amilcare Malagola (1840–1895), Italian Roman Catholic cardinal
Carlo Malagola (1855–1910), Italian historian
Gedeone Malagola (1924–2008), Brazilian comics artist and editor

Surnames of Italian origin